Kristian Kolby (born 9 October 1978) is a Danish racing driver from Ringkøbing in Denmark.

Career 

Kolby was based in the United Kingdom for many years and was a successful junior single seater racer.

He was British Formula Ford champion for the Van Diemen team. He went on to become a race winner in the Formula Three series, finishing 4th in the British championship in 1999, and the American Indy Lights series. His win in Indy Lights at Kansas is one of the world's closest motor race finishes as he narrowly beat Irishman Damien Faulkner.

Before finishing in single seater racing he also competed in the Le Mans 24-hour race for the DAMS (Driot-Arnoux Motorsport) Cadillac team. He also competed in touring car races in the Danish Touring Car Challenge.

Kolby retired from racing in 2003 at a young age due to his backers going into receivership.

He was also a founding member of the I.A.G.

Racing record

Complete International Formula 3000 results
(key) (Races in bold indicate pole position; races in italics indicate fastest lap.)

24 Hours of Le Mans results

References

1978 births
British Formula Renault 2.0 drivers
International Formula 3000 drivers
Auto GP drivers
Living people
Formula Ford drivers
People from Ringkøbing-Skjern Municipality
Conquest Racing drivers
DAMS drivers
Scuderia Coloni drivers
Fortec Motorsport drivers
British Formula Three Championship drivers